Mainé-Soroa is a department of the Diffa Region in Niger. Its capital lies at the city of Mainé-Soroa.

The department's population is  largely made up of ethnic Kanouris and Fula, both cultures with longstanding pastoral semi-nomadic traditions. As of 2011, the department had a total population of 202,534 people.

References

Departments of Niger
Diffa Region